Ian Rotsey (born 31 October 1980) is a Caymanian cricketer. He played in the 2014 ICC World Cricket League Division Five tournament.

References

External links
 

1980 births
Living people
Caymanian cricketers
Place of birth missing (living people)
Wicket-keepers